San Joaquin de la Vega is a locality Miranda population of the municipality (Zulia), belonging to the parish of San Antonio del Táchira. It is one of the most populated areas of the municipality Miranda being overtaken by the Board of Ciruma and Ports of Altagracia respectively.

San Joaquin is a rural town with a population of about 7,500 inhabitants, has some access roads in poor condition, its inhabitants have water pipes, however the supply is poor and not have all sanitation, a problem that has not been solved by government authorities, so many buy water. Beneath the land of that location has several wells with clean fresh water but not all have the resources to take it. The population is engaged in agriculture, animal husbandry and tourism despite its remote location far from the lake and is a popular destination on the eastern shore of the lake and the inhabitants of the neighboring villages because of their traditions.

Probably named after the saint with the same name.

Vegetation 
Has landscape of dry forest and wet forest and compound relief, mainly of hills and ridges. The present town is the heir of Miranda Municipality entity comprising the same territory between 1884 and 1989.

Etymology  
San Joaquin is named after the saint with the same name because the inhabitants were devoted at that time. The town's origins are closely linked with the first settlements of slaves and peasants who worked on the neighboring estate; this population remained, in the last years of the colony, occupied in his farming and creating a small society of aristocrats, freedmen and slaves, where the names of the first thirteen settlers continue linked to the history of our people, through their descendants.

References

External links
 Listing San joaquin de la Vega on Your Archives (Spanish)

Cities in Zulia